Charles Dutton may refer to:

 Charles Dutton (politician) (1834–1904), pastoralist and politician in colonial Queensland (Australia)
 Charles Dutton, 7th Baron Sherborne (1911–1983), British peer
 Charles S. Dutton (born 1951), American actor and producer
 Charles M. Dutton, Crew Chief Spc. in the Warlords, B-Company of the 123rd Aviation Battalion in the American Division, killed in the Vietnam War
 Charles Christian Dutton (died 1842), pastoralist in South Australia